Philip of Burgundy-Beveren (c. 1450 – 1498), lord of Beveren, was a son of Antoine, bastard of Burgundy, illegitimate son of Philip the Good and Jeanne de Presle, and Marie de la Viesville.

Life 
Philip of Burgundy-Beveren married Anna van Borselen. He would thus succeed to the power of her father Wolfert VI van Borselen in Zeeland. On 31 May 1486, he became Lord of Veere in succession of Maximilian of Austria who had dismissed Wolfert in 1485 and taken over the title himself. As Lord of Veere, Philip resided at Zandenburg.

Philip of Burgundy-Beveren also succeeded Cornelis van Bergen as admiral of the Netherlands (1491–1498). He became Knight in the Order of the Golden Fleece in 1478.

References

Sources 

Knights of the Golden Fleece
1450s births
1498 deaths